The 14th Trampoline World Championships were held in Paris, France from 16 to 18 October 1986.

Results

Men

Trampoline Individual

Trampoline Team

Trampoline Synchro

Double Mini Trampoline

Double Mini Trampoline Team

Tumbling

Tumbling Team

Women

Trampoline Individual

Trampoline Team

Trampoline Synchro

Double Mini Trampoline

Double Mini Trampoline Team

Tumbling

Tumbling Team

References
 Trampoline UK

Trampoline World Championships
Trampoline Gymnastics World Championships
Trampoline World Championships
Trampoline World Championships
International gymnastics competitions hosted by France